Tunku Abdul Rahman University of Management & Technology, abbreviated TAR UMT, is a non-profit, private university in Malaysia. Named after the country's first prime minister, Tunku Abdul Rahman, the school was founded in 1969 as Tunku Abdul Rahman College (or TAR College) by the Malaysian Chinese Association (MCA). On 2 May 2013, it officially became a university college under the name Tunku Abdul Rahman University College (TAR UC) until 2022, which it changed its name to TAR UMT. TAR UMT is one of the largest and oldest institutions of higher learning in Malaysia with more than 270,000 students having passed through its doors.

The university also has five branches across Malaysia, in the states of Penang, Perak, Johor, Pahang and Sabah. The first branch campus, in Penang, began at a temporary location in 1994 before moving to Tanjung Bungah five years later. The second and third branch campuses were founded in Kampar, Perak and Johor in 1998, and the Pahang faculty branch was established in 1999. The Sabah faculty branch was founded in 2002 in Sabah, East Malaysia.

The university has a student population of over 28,000, including international students from 24 countries including China, Hong Kong, Mauritius, Papua New Guinea, India, Algeria, Brunei, Sri Lanka, Somalia, Pakistan, United Kingdom, Syria and Yemen etc. Over 50 years since its inception, TAR UMT has produced more than 270,000 alumni.

TAR UMT is the only institution in the world to conduct the Internally Assessed ACCA Fundamentals programme, and the only institution in Malaysia to be granted the Graduate Gateway status by the Chartered Institute of Marketing. TAR UMT obtained a SETARA 5-Star rating for the year 2018/2019 awarded by the Ministry of Higher Education, in its inaugural participation.

History

In the early years of Malaysian independence, there was a lack of opportunity to pursue higher education. An institution of higher learning was suggested by Malaysian Chinese Association president Tun Tan Siew Sin. Tan initially suggested the Chinese-language Merdeka University, which was rejected by the government. As a compromise, an English-medium college was proposed. In April 1968, Tan appointed a working team (chaired by Tan Sri Khaw Kai Boh) to make recommendations for an institution of higher learning.

Its blueprint was submitted to the government, and received the support of Minister of Education Mohamed Khir Johari. The working team estimated that it would require RM 20 million to set up the college, and the government agreed to provide the financial assistance on a dollar-for-dollar basis. Prime Minister Tunku Abdul Rahman consented to the college being named for him.

TAR College began operations on 24 February 1969 with its School of Pre-University Studies and an initial enrollment of 764 students. A 15 September 1972 Instrument of Government provided the legal framework for the administration of the college. Minister of Education Tun Hussein Onn presented the instrument to Tan Siew Sin, the first college president. To raise funds for a campus in Kuala Lumpur, the MCA launched a national fundraising campaign in 1972 led by MCA publicity director Lee San Choon.

In February 1973, the government approved the allocation of land for the main Kuala Lumpur campus in Setapak. The ground-breaking ceremony was officiated by Rahman in August 1973. Phase one, including an administrative building, a library, two laboratory blocks, one large and eight small lecture theatres and a canteen, was completed in 1976.

Fundraising activities in the 1990s, such as the nationwide TAR College Fund-Raising Campaign, Taxithon, Walkathon, TAR College Torch Run and Motorthon, were led by TAR College Council chairman Ling Liong Sik. Expansion continued under the leadership of TAR College Council chairmen Ong Ka Ting and Chua Soi Lek. Since its 2013 upgrade to a university college, TAR UC continued its steady development under the leadership of Liow Tiong Lai. The latest infrastructure development, a ground breaking ceremony for  the construction of a Student Centre at the Kuala Lumpur Main Campus was held on 30 October 2021.

Targeted to be completed in 2024, this Student Centre is a dedicated hub for students’ activities which will be equipped with many modern facilities and amenities and it is aimed at enhancing the multi-dimensional learning for students. The Student Centre is a 7-storey building with total built-up area of 1,470,832 sqft comprising 1,408 car parking lots.

Institutional Awards
Asia Pacific CSR Awards 2016

TAR UC was accorded the Excellence in Education Improvement award in the Asia Pacific CSR Awards 2016 under the award category of Socially Responsible Company in Education Improvement on 27 September 2016.

Premier Digital Technology Institution

TAR UC was recognised with the Premier Digital Tech Institution status by the Malaysia Digital Economy Corporation (MDEC) and the Ministry of Higher Education in 2017. This status was renewed again in 2019 and 2021.

SETARA 5-Star Ranking

TAR UC obtained SETARA 5-Star rating for the year 2018/2019 under the University Colleges category by the Ministry of Higher Education, in its inaugural participation.

Faculties
{
  "type": "ExternalData",
  "service": "geoshape",
  "ids": "Q7853255",
  "properties": {
    "title": "Tunku Abdul Rahman University College",
    "description": "Main Campus",
  }
}

Faculty of Accountancy, Finance and Business (FAFB)
Programmes are offered at diploma, undergraduate and/or postgraduate levels in:

Accounting
Accounting and Finance
 Banking and Finance 
 Business Administration 
Business Economics
Commerce
Corporate Administration
Corporate Governance
E-commerce & Marketing
Economics
E-marketing
Entrepreneurship
Finance
 Finance & Investment
 Human Resource Management 
 International Business
Investment Management
 Logistics & Supply Chain Management 
Marketing
 Retail Management

Accreditation

TAR UMT is the only institution in the world to be accorded the exclusive privilege to run the Internally Assessed ACCA Applied Knowledge and Applied Skills level examinations where students of the Bachelor of Commerce (Honours) programme are granted exemptions from all 9 papers of this level upon completion of their second year of study.

TAR UMT students under the Bachelor of Accounting (Honours) programme are granted conditional exemptions for all the 9 Applied Knowledge and Applied Skills level papers upon graduation.

TAR UMT has also been recognised as a CIMA Global Learning Premium Partner where students under the Bachelor of Accounting (Honours) programme are granted the maximum exemption of 11 out of 16 papers of CIMA.

Additionally, TAR UMT is the first and only CIM Graduate Gateway accredited university in Malaysia where students under the Bachelor of Business (Honours) in Marketing programme are given exemption on Accreditation of Prior Learning (APL) basis from one out of three modules of the CIM Diploma in Professional Marketing.

Other accreditations and exemptions secured by relevant FAFB programmes are as follows:
 ICSA: Exemption for 2 - 3 out of 7 papers (Bachelor's degree), and full exemption for all papers (Master's degree).
 ICAEW:  Exemption for 8 out of 15 papers.
 MICPA:  Exemption for 4 out of 9 papers.
 CPA Australia: Exemption for 6 out of 12 papers.
 FPAM: Exemption for 3 out of 4 modules of the CFP certification programme.
MACS: Exemption from 14 out of 16 papers

Faculty of Engineering and Technology (FOET)

Programmes are offered at diploma, undergraduate and/or postgraduate levels in:

 Mechatronics
 Electrical and Electronics Engineering
Engineering Science
 Mechanical Engineering
Product Development Technology

Accreditation
TAR UMT offers engineering programmes that are accredited by the Engineering Accreditation Council, Board of Engineers Malaysia.

Faculty of Built Environment (FOBE)

Programmes are offered at diploma, undergraduate and/or postgraduate levels in:

 Architecture
 Interior Architecture 
 Building 
 Real Estate Management
 Construction Management & Economics 
 Quantity Surveying

Accreditation

FOBE programmes are designed and delivered in accordance with the requirements of and/or accredited by the respective statutory boards and/or the following professional bodies: 
 Board of Quantity Surveyors Malaysia (BQSM) 
 Board of Valuers, Appraisers, Estate Agents and Property Managers Malaysia (BoVAEP)
Board of Architects Malaysia (Lembaga Arkitek Malaysia, LAM)
Chartered Institute of Building (CIOB) 
 Royal Institution of Surveyors Malaysia (RISM)
Royal Institution of Chartered Surveyors (RICS)

Faculty of Applied Sciences (FOAS)

Programmes are offered at diploma, undergraduate and/or postgraduate levels in:

 Analytical Chemistry
 Bioscience with Chemistry
 Chemistry & Biology 
 Food Science
 Sports & Exercise Science
 Aquaculture
 Applied Physics (Instrumentation)

Accreditation

Relevant TAR UC programmes are endorsed by Institut Kimia Malaysia (IKM) and graduates of these programmes may join IKM as a member after gaining two years’ working experience in chemistry-related industries and recognised as “Registered Chemists" in Malaysia.

TAR UC is also listed on the list of universities in the Food Analyst Registration Information System in Malaysia (FaRIS). Graduates from relevant TAR UC programmes may apply as registered food analysts online with the Ministry of Health under the Food Analyst Act which was passed in 2011.

Faculty of Computing and Information Technology (FOCS)

Programmes are offered at diploma, undergraduate and/or postgraduate levels in:

 Computer Science 
 Data Science 
 Business Information Systems
 Information Security 
 Information Systems Engineering
 Interactive Software Technology
 Internet Technology 
 ICT Applications / ICT Support Systems
 IT Entrepreneurship 
 Management Mathematics with Computing 
 Mobile Application Development 
 Microelectronics
 Software Engineering 
 Software Systems Development

Industry Professional Certification 
Students are prepared for Industry Professional Certification in the following focus areas: 
 Cisco Certified Network Associate (CCNA)
 Cisco Certified Network Associate Security (CCNA Security)
 CompTIA Security+
 CompTIA Linux+
 CompTIA A+
 ISTQB Certified Tester Foundation Level (CTFL)

Faculty of Social Science and Humanities (FSSH)

Programmes are offered at diploma, undergraduate and/or postgraduate levels in:

 Counselling/ Psychology
 English with Drama
English with Education
English Studies
Early Childhood Education
 Hospitality Management
 Tourism Management
 Hospitality & Catering Management
 Baking & Cake Artistry
 Culinary Arts
 Food Service
 Event Management
 Gastropreneurship

Faculty of Communication and Creative Industries (FCCI)

Programmes are offered at diploma, undergraduate and/or postgraduate levels in:

 Advertising 
 Communication Studies
 Broadcast Communication
 Journalism 
 Media Studies 
 Public Relations 
 Graphic Design 
 Multimedia Design 
 Fashion Design

Centre for Pre-University Studies (CPUS)
The Centre for Pre-University Studies (CPUS), formerly known as the School of Pre-University Studies was established in 1969 and offers Malaysian Qualifications Agency accredited programmes in:

 Foundation in Science
 Foundation in Arts
 Foundation in Accounting 
 Foundation in Business 
Foundation in Computing
 Foundation in Engineering

Centre for Postgraduate Studies and Research (CPSR)
The CPSR was founded in October 2013 to provide infrastructure and support to TAR UC to conduct postgraduate-level programmes and assist academic staff to pursue scholarly research. The centre is tasked with the admission of the college's postgraduate students (those studying for master's, PhD and other graduate qualifications).

The centre manages the college's research grants. In 2014, the college secured three Fundamental Research Grant Scheme grants from the Ministry of Education (totaling RM376,400) for 2014–2016.

CPSR currently offers the following postgraduate and doctorate programmes:

Main Campus Facilities

The campus covers 186 acres of land and surrounded by hilly greenery

Global Academic Partnerships

Afghanistan
Australia
Bangladesh
Bhutan
Brunei
Cambodia
China
Cyprus
France
Gambia
Ghana
India
Indonesia

Iran
Ireland
Japan
Kazakhstan
Korea
Laos
Mali
Myanmar
Nepal
Nigeria
Pakistan
Palestine
Philippines

Poland
South Africa
Sri Lanka
Switzerland
Thailand
Tunisia
Turkey
United Arab Emirates
United Kingdom
 United States
Vietnam

Notable alumni
Chow Kon Yeow, Chief Minister of Penang (2018–Present)
Chong Eng, Penang State Executive Councillor (2013–Present)
Teresa Kok, Member of Parliament of Seputeh (1999–Present)
Teo Kok Seong, Negeri Sembilan State Executive Councillor (2018–Present)
Liow Cai Tung, Johor State Executive Councillor (2018–2020)
Gan Mei Yan, actress & host
Karen Kong Cheng Tshe (龚柯允), singer
Wayne Chua Poi Suan (蔡佩璇), actress
Roger Tan Kor Mee, lawyer
Michael 'Kael' Leo Chin, singer & actor
Sofea Nursolehha Tun 'Fea', host Malaysia Hari Ini, 999 and former DJ Traxx FM

References

External links

 

1969 establishments in Malaysia
Architecture schools in Malaysia
Business schools in Malaysia
Cambridge schools in Malaysia
Colleges in Malaysia
Design schools in Malaysia
Journalism schools in Malaysia
Educational institutions established in 1969
Engineering universities and colleges in Malaysia
Hospitality schools in Malaysia
Information technology schools in Malaysia
Private universities and colleges in Malaysia
Universities and colleges in Kuala Lumpur
Information technology institutes
Malaysian Chinese Association
Malaysian educational websites